Eileen Pedde is an American actress.

Pedde made her debut in the TV series The Little Kidnappers in 1990. She has appeared in numerous major American television series including The X-Files and Smallville (2003) but is perhaps best known for her role as Gunnery Sergeant Erin Mathias in Battlestar Galactica. She starred in the 2007 film Juno.

Filmography

 The Little Kidnappers (1990, TV Movie) - Mrs. Hooft
 Nightmare Street (1998, TV Movie) - Young Mother
 The X-Files (1996-1998, TV Series) - Angie / Mrs. Skur
 Welcome to Paradox (1998, TV Series) - Reporter #2
 I'll Be Home for Christmas (1998) Turf 'n Turf Customer #3
 Millennium (1998, TV Series) 'PAIN' Victim / Doctor / Dr. Miriam Greenwald / Karen Jarret
 Our Guys: Outrage at Glen Ridge (1999, TV Movie) - Irate Parent
 Atomic Train (1999, TV Mini-Series) - FEMA Worker
 Deadlocked (2000) - Manager
 A Feeling Called Glory (2000, Short) - Adult Beth Narrator (voice)
 So Weird (2000, TV Series) - Ms. James
 Dark Angel (2000, TV Series) Hannah Sukova
 Da Vinci's Inquest (2000, TV Series) - ER Doctor
 Life or Something Like It (2002) - Stage Manager
 Black Point (2002) - Lisa
 Just Deal (2000–2002, TV Series) - Coleen Roberts
 The Twilight Zone (2002, TV Series) - Joyce Winslow
 Taken (2002, TV Mini-Series) Nora
 Stephen King's Dead Zone (2003, TV Series) - Mrs. Cahill
 Final Destination 2 (2003) - Anesthesiologist
 The Core (2003) - Lynne
 Smallville (2003, TV Series) - Jennifer Small
 Freddy vs. Jason (2003) - School Nurse
 Human Cargo (2004, TV Mini-Series) - Peggy
 Tru Calling (2004, TV Series) - Patricia Norris
 The 4400 (2004, TV Series) - Patty Griffin
 14 Hours (2005, TV Movie) - CVICU Doctor
 Amber Frey: Witness for the Prosecution (2005, TV Movie) - House Reporter #1
 Stargate SG-1 (2005, TV Series) - Major Gibson
 Neverwas (2005) - Waitress
 Terminal City (2005, TV Series) - Nurse Julie
 Killer Instinct (2006, TV Series) - Eliana Cole
 Kyle XY (2006, TV Series) - Anna Manfredi
 Juno (2007) - Gerta Rauss
 Battlestar Galactica: Razor (2007, TV Movie) - Sgt. Mathias
 Blood Ties (2007–2008, TV Series) - Crowley
 Battlestar Galactica (2006–2008, TV Series) - Sgt. Erin Mathias
 Storm in the Heartland (2009, TV Movie) 0 Colleen
 Life Unexpected (2010, TV Series) - Caseworker
 Supernatural (2010-2016) - Mrs. Frankle / Dr. Kessler
 Fairly Legal (2011, TV Series) - Marsha Neumeier
 Finding a Family (2011, TV Movie) - Principal Thomas
 Travelers (2016, TV Series) - Mom
 Death Note (2017) - New Teacher
 Parallel (2018) - Librarian
 Reunited at Christmas (2019 Hallmark film) - Claire Murphy

References

External links
 

American television actresses
Year of birth missing (living people)
Living people
21st-century American women